Calyampudi Radhakrishna Rao FRS (born 10 September 1920), commonly known as C. R. Rao, is an Indian-American mathematician and statistician. He is currently professor emeritus at Pennsylvania State University and Research Professor at the University at Buffalo. Rao has  been honoured by numerous colloquia, honorary degrees, and festschrifts and was awarded the US National Medal of Science in 2002. The American Statistical Association has described him as "a living legend whose work has influenced not just statistics, but has had far reaching implications for fields as varied as economics, genetics, anthropology, geology, national planning, demography, biometry, and medicine." The Times of India listed Rao as one of the top 10 Indian scientists of all time. Rao is also a Senior Policy and Statistics advisor for the Indian Heart Association non-profit focused on raising South Asian cardiovascular disease awareness.

Early life
C. R. Rao was the eighth of the ten children born to a Telugu family in Hadagali, Bellary, Madras Presidency (now in Karnataka), India. His schooling was completed in Gudur, Nuzvid, Nandigama, and Visakhapatnam, all in the present state of Andhra Pradesh. He received an MSc in mathematics from Andhra University and an MA in statistics from Calcutta University in 1943. He obtained a PhD degree at King's College in Cambridge University under R. A. Fisher in 1948, to which he added a DSc degree, also from Cambridge, in 1965.

Rao first worked at the Indian Statistical Institute and the Anthropological Museum in Cambridge. Later he held several important positions, as the Director of the Indian Statistical Institute, Jawaharlal Nehru Professor and National Professor in India, University Professor at the University of Pittsburgh and Eberly Professor and Chair of Statistics and Director of the Center for Multivariate Analysis at Pennsylvania State University.

As Head and later Director of the Research and Training School at the Indian Statistical Institute for a period of over 40 years, Rao developed research and training programs and produced several leaders in the field of Mathematics. On the basis of Rao's recommendation, the ASI (The Asian Statistical Institute) now known as Statistical Institute for Asia and Pacific was established in Tokyo to provide training to statisticians working in government and industrial organizations.

Among his best-known discoveries are the Cramér–Rao bound and the Rao–Blackwell theorem both related to the quality of estimators. Other areas he worked in include multivariate analysis, estimation theory, and differential geometry. His other contributions include the Fisher–Rao theorem, Rao distance, and orthogonal arrays. He is the author of 14 books and has published over 400 journal publications.

Rao has received 38 honorary doctoral degrees from universities in 19 countries around the world and numerous awards and medals for his contributions to statistics and science. He is a member of eight National Academies in India, the United Kingdom, the United States, and Italy. Rao was awarded the United States National Medal of Science, that nation's highest award for lifetime achievement in fields of scientific research, in June 2002. He was given the India Science Award in 2010, the highest honor conferred by the government of India in a scientific domain. In 2013, he was nominated for the Nobel Peace Prize, along with Miodrag Lovric (Editor) and Shlomo Sawilowsky, for their contribution to the International Encyclopedia of Statistical Science. He was most recently honoured with his 38th honorary doctorate by the Indian Institute of Technology, Kharagpur, on 26 July 2014 for "his contributions to the foundations of modern statistics through the introduction of concepts such as Cramér–Rao inequality, Rao–Blackwellization, Rao distance, Rao measure, and for introducing the idea of orthogonal arrays for the industry to design high-quality products."

He was the President of the International Statistical Institute, Institute of Mathematical Statistics (USA), and the International Biometric Society. He was inducted into the Hall of Fame of India's National Institution for Quality and Reliability (Chennai Branch) for his contribution to industrial statistics and the promotion of quality control programs in industries.

The Journal of Quantitative Economics published a special issue in Rao's honor in 1991. "Dr. Rao is a very distinguished scientist and a highly eminent statistician of our time. His contributions to statistical theory and
applications are well known, and many of his results, which bear his name, are included in the curriculum of courses in statistics at bachelor's and master's level all over the world. He is an inspiring teacher and has guided the
research work of numerous students in all areas of statistics. His early work had greatly influenced the course of statistical research during the last four decades. One of the purposes of this special issue is to recognize Dr. Rao's own contributions to econometrics and acknowledge his major role in the
development of econometric research in India."

Areas of research contributions

 Estimation theory
 Statistical inference and linear models
 Multivariate analysis
 Combinatorial design
 Orthogonal arrays
 Biometry
 Statistical genetics
 Generalized matrix inverses
 Functional equations

Awards and medals

 Guy Medal in Gold (2011) of the Royal Statistical Society
 India Science Award 2010 (the highest award in a scientific field presented by government of India)
 International Mahalanobis Prize (2003) of the International Statistical Institute
 Srinivasa Ramanujan Medal (2003) of the Indian National Science Academy
 Sardar Patel Lifetime Achievement International Award (Sardar Ratna) (2014) by Sardar Patel International Foundation, India  
 President George W. Bush, on 12 June 2002, honoured him with the National Medal of Science, the highest award in US in the scientific field, as a "prophet of new age" with the citation, "for his pioneering contributions to the foundations of statistical theory and multivariate statistical methodology and their applications, enriching the physical, biological, mathematical, economic and engineering sciences."
 Padma Vibhushan (2001) by the Government of India
 Mahalanobis Centenary Gold Medal (1993?) of the Indian Science Congress
 Wilks Memorial Award (1989) of the American Statistical Association
 Padma Bhushan (1968)
 Megnadh Saha Medal (1969) of the Indian National Science Academy
 Guy Medal in Silver (1965) of the Royal Statistical Society
 S. S. Bhatnagar Award (1963) of Council of Scientific and Industrial Research
 JC Bose Gold Medal of the Bose Institute
 Gold Medal of the University of Calcutta
 He was also awarded an honorary Doctor of Science by the University of Calcutta in 2003. Also honorary doctorates from a number of universities and institutes around the world.

In his honour

 The Pennsylvania State University has established C. R. and Bhargavi Rao Prize in Statistics
 CR Rao Advanced Institute of Mathematics, Statistics and Computer Science
 National Award in Statistics established by Ministry of Statistics and Programme Implementation (MoSPI), Government of India.
 The road from IIIT Hyderabad passing along Central University of Hyderabad crossroads to Alind Factory, Lingampally is named as "Prof. C.R. Rao Road".

Selected publications
Books

 2020. PEREIRA, B. de B.; RAO, Calyampudi Radhakrishna.; OLIVEIRA, F. B.;Statistical Learning Using Neural Networks: A Guide for Statisticians and Data Scientists with Python, CRC Press, London.
 2017. Book Review: Multivariate Statistical Methods, A Primer
 2016. (with Lovric, M.) Testing Point Null Hypothesis of a Normal Mean and the Truth: 21st Century Perspective
 2009. (with PEREIRA, B. de B.) Data Mining Using Neural Networks: A Guide for Statisticians. State College, Pennsylvania, 2009. 186 p.
 1999. (with Helge Toutenburg, Andreas Fieger et al.). Linear Models: Least Squares and Alternatives, 2ed, Springer Series in Statistics. Springer
 1998. (with M. Bhaskara Rao). Matrix Algebra & Its Applications to Statistics & Econometrics. World Scientific
 1997. Statistics And Truth: Putting Chance To Work, 2ed. Wspc
 1996. Principal Component and Factor Analyses. PN
 1996. Extensions of a Characterization of an Exponential Distribution Based on a Censored Ordered Sample.
 1996. Bootstrap by Sequential Resampling. PN
 1993. Applications of Multivariate Analysis. PN
 1992. Signal Estimation, Multitarget Tracking and Related Areas.
 1989. Multivariate Analysis and Its Applications. PN
 1988. Linear Transformations, Projection Operators and Generalized Inverses; A Geometric Approach. PN
 1984. Recent Results on Characterization of Probability Distributions: A unified Approach through Extensions of Deny's Theorem. PN
 1973. Linear Statistical Inference and Its Applications, 2nd Edition. Wiley-Interscience
 1973. On a Unified Theory of Estimation in Linear Models. PN
 1973. (with A.M. Kagan et al.). Characterization Problems in Mathematical Statistics, Wiley Series in Probability & Mathematical Statistics.
 1972. (with Sujit Kumar Mitra). Generalized Inverse of Matrices and Its Applications, Probability & Mathematical Statistics. John Wiley & Sons
 1963. Essays on econometrics and planning. Statistical Pub. Society

Edited Volumes

 2015. (Ed. with Marepalli B. Rao). Handbook of Statistics 32: Computational Statistics with. Elsevier
 2013. (Ed. with Venu Govindaraju). Handbook of Statistics 31: Machine Learning: Theory and Applications. North Holland
 2012. (Ed. with Tata Subba Rao and Suhasini Subba Rao). Handbook of Statistics 30: Time Series Analysis: Methods and Applications . North Holland
 2012. (Ed. with Ranajit Chakraborty and Pranab K. Sen). Handbook of Statistics 28: Bioinformatics in Human Health and Heredity. North Holland
 2011. (Ed. with Dipak K. Dey). Essential Bayesian Models.  North Holland
 2011. (Ed. with Danny Pfeffermann). Essential Methods for Design Based Sample Surveys. North Holland
 2009. (Ed. with Danny Pfeffermann). Handbook of Statistics 29A: Sample Surveys: Design, Methods and Applications. North Holland
 2009. (Ed. with Danny Pfeffermann). Handbook of statistics 29B Sample Surveys: Inference and Analysis. North Holland
 2007. (Ed. with J. Philip Miller and D.C. Rao). Handbook of Statistics 27: Epidemiology and Medical Statistics. North Holland
 2006. (Ed. with Sandip Sinharay). Handbook of Statistics, Volume 26: Psychometrics. North Holland
 2005. (Ed. with Dipak K. Dey). Handbook of Statistics 25: Bayesian Thinking, Modeling and Computation. North Holland
 2005. (Ed.). Handbook of Statistics 24: Data Mining and Data Visualization. North Holland
 2004. (Ed. with N. Balakrishnan). Handbook of Statistics 23: Advances in Survival Analysis. North Holland
 2003. (Ed. with Ravindra Khattree). Handbook of Statistics 22: Statistics in Industry. North Holland
 2001. (Ed. with N. Balakrishnan). Handbook of Statistics 20: Advances in Reliability, North-Holland Mathematics Studies. Elsevier
 2001. (Ed. with D. N. Shanbhag). Handbook of Statistics 19: Stochastic Processes: Theory and Methods. North-Holland
 2000. (Ed. with Pranab Kumar Sen). Handbook of Statistics 18: Bioenvironmental and Public Health Statistics. North-Holland
 1998. (Ed. with N. Balakrishnan). Handbook of Statistics 17: Order Statistics: Applications. North-Holland
 1998. (Ed. with N. Balakrishnan). Handbook of Statistics 16: Order Statistics: Theory & Methods. North-Holland
 1997. (Ed. with G.S. Maddala). Handbook of Statistics 15: Robust Inference. Elsevier
 1996. (Ed. with G.S. Maddala). Handbook of Statistics 14: Statistical Methods in Finance. Elsevier
 1996. (Ed. with S. Ghosh). Handbook of Statistics 13: Design and Analysis of Experiments. North Holland
 1994. (Ed. with G.P. Patil). Handbook of Statistics 12: Environmental Statistics. Elsevier
 1994. (Ed. with G.P. Patil). Multivariate Environmental Statistics., Volume 6 in North-Holland Series in Statistics and Probability. North Holland
 1993. (Ed. with G. S. Maddala and H. D. Vinod). Handbook of Statistics 11: Econometrics, Techniques and Instrumentation in Analytical Chemistry. Elsevier
 1993. (Ed. with N. K. Bose). Handbook of Statistics 10: Signal Processing and its Applications, Elsevier
 1993. (Ed.). Handbook of Statistics 9: Computational Statistics. North-Holland	
 1991. (Ed. with R. Chakraborty). Handbook of Statistics 8: Statistical Methods in Biological and Medical Sciences. North-Holland.
 1988. (Ed. with Krishnaiah P.R.). Handbook of Statistics 7: Quality Control and Reliability. 	
 1988. (Ed. with P. R. Krishnaiah). Handbook of Statistics 6: Sampling. North-Holland.
 1969. (Ed. with R. C. Bose, I. M. Chakravarti et al.). Essays in Probability and Statistics, Monograph Series in Probability and Statistics. The University of North Carolina Press

Textbooks

 1970. Advanced Statistical Methods in Biometric Research. Macmillan
Collected Works
 1996. Selected Papers of C.R. Rao 3. (Ed). S. Das Gupta et al. Wiley-Interscience
 1995. Advances in Econometrics and Quantitative Economics, Essays in Honor of Professor C.R. Rao. (Eds.) G. S. Maddala, T. N. Srinivasan, and Peter C. B. Phillips. Wiley-Blackwell
 1994. Selected Papers of C.R. Rao 2. (Ed). S. Das Gupta et al. Wiley-Interscience
 1994. Selected Papers of C.R. Rao 1. (Ed). S. Das Gupta et al. Wiley-Interscience
 1982. Statistics and Probability: Essays in Honor of C. R. Rao. (Ed.). Kallinapur. Elsevier

References

Further reading
 Nalini Krishnankutty, 1996. Putting Chance to Work: A Life in Statistics: A Biography of C. R. Rao.

Sources
 Calyampudi Radhakrishnan Rao. University of Minnesota Morris
 Statisticians in History: Calyampudi R. Rao". American Statistical Association
 "Prof. C R Rao : An Eminent Statistician" By Bibhuprasad Mohapatra. Govt. of Odisha.

External links

 C. R. Rao Advanced Institute of Mathematics, India
 Prof. Rao's page at Penn State
 Prof. Rao's page at the University at Buffalo
 ET Interviews: Professor C. R. Rao on the Econometric Theory page.
Royal Society citation 1967
 Rao was awarded the Samuel S. Wilks Award in 1989
 

For the Cramér–Rao inequality and the Rao–Blackwell theorem see the relevant entries on
 Earliest Known Uses of Some of the Words of Mathematics
For Rao contribution to information geometry
 Cramer-Rao Lower Bound and Information Geometry
Photograph of Rao with Harald Cramér in 1978
 C. R. Rao from the PORTRAITS OF STATISTICIANS
 President George Bush awarding Rao the National Medal of Science

1920 births
Living people
20th-century Indian mathematicians
Alumni of King's College, Cambridge
20th-century American mathematicians
Andhra University alumni
Fellows of the American Statistical Association
Fellows of the Royal Society
21st-century Indian mathematicians
Indian statisticians
Telugu people
Members of the United States National Academy of Sciences
National Medal of Science laureates
Pennsylvania State University faculty
American people of Telugu descent
People from Bellary district
Presidents of the Institute of Mathematical Statistics
Presidents of the International Statistical Institute
Recipients of the Padma Bhushan in science & engineering
Recipients of the Padma Vibhushan in science & engineering
University at Buffalo faculty
University of Calcutta alumni
Indian Statistical Institute alumni
Academic staff of the Indian Statistical Institute
Scientists from Andhra Pradesh
American academics of Indian descent
Fellows of the Econometric Society
Recipients of the Shanti Swarup Bhatnagar Award in Mathematical Science
American centenarians
Indian centenarians
Men centenarians
People from Andhra Pradesh
Probability theorists
Detection and estimation theorists
21st-century American mathematicians
Indian emigrants to the United States
American expatriates in the United Kingdom
Mathematical statisticians